{|

{{Infobox ship characteristics
|Hide header=
|Header caption= The pilot had ignored the ship's officers who had warned that she drew too much water for the route he had chosen. Another major problem was that the Royal Navy had pressed much of her crew when she returned, leaving her short-handed.

The stranding broke her back and Middlesex became a total loss. Small craft, however, had saved part of her cargo of sugar and cotton. At an auction on 7 September at Lloyd's Coffee House her hull sold for £270, and the remains of her cargo for £190.

Notes, citations, and references
Notes

Citations

References
  
 
 
Proceedings Relative to Ships Tendered for the Service of the United East-India Company, from the Twenty-sixth of March, 1794, to the Sixth of January, 1795: With an Appendix.

1783 ships
Age of Sail merchant ships of England
Ships of the British East India Company
Maritime incidents in 1796